is the first Buddhist temple or Shinto shrine visit of the Japanese New Year. Many visit on the first, second, or third day of the year as most are off work on those days. Generally, wishes for the new year are made, new omamori (charms or amulets) are bought, and the old ones are returned to the shrine so they can be cremated. There are often long lines at major shrines throughout Japan.

Most of the people in Japan outside of the retail and emergency services professions are off work from December 29 until January 3 of every year. It is during this time that the house is cleaned, debts are paid, friends and family are visited and gifts are exchanged. It would be customary to spend the early morning of New Year's Day in domestic worship, followed by consumption of sake (toso) and special celebration food (e.g. osechi, zōni). The act of worship is generally quite brief and individual and may involve queuing at popular shrines.

Some shrines and temples have millions of visitors over the three days. Sensoji temple in Tokyo is the most popular one. Meiji Shrine for example had 3.45 million visitors in 1998, and in the first three days of January 2010, 3.2 million people visited Meiji Jingū, 2.98 million Narita-san, 2.96 million Kawasaki Daishi, 2.7 million Fushimi Inari-taisha, and 2.6 million Sumiyoshi Taisha. Other popular destinations include Atsuta Jingū, Tsurugaoka Hachimangū, Dazaifu Tenman-gū, and Hikawa Shrine.

A common custom during hatsumōde is to buy a written oracle called omikuji. If your omikuji predicts bad luck you can tie it onto a tree on the shrine grounds, in the hope that its prediction will not come true. The omikuji goes into detail, and tells you how you will do in various areas in your life, such as business and love, for that year, in a similar way to horoscopes in the West.  Often a good-luck charm comes with the omikuji when you buy it, that is believed to summon good luck and money your way. 
Shrines make much of their money in the first week or two of the year.

See also
 Glossary of Shinto
 Saisaki-mode

References

Shinto
New Year in Japan
Shinto and society
Buddhism and society